The large moth family Gelechiidae contains the following genera:

Hapalonoma
Haplochela
Haplovalva
Harmatitis
Harpagidia
Hedma
Helcystogramma
Heliangara
Hemiarcha
Hierangela
Holaxyra
Holcophora
Holcophoroides
Holophysis
Homotima
Horridovalva
Hylograptis
Hyodectis
Hypatima
Hyperecta
Hypodrasia

References

 Natural History Museum Lepidoptera genus database

Gelechiidae
Gelechiid